Jean-Baptiste-Georges Proulx (April 23, 1809 – January 27, 1884) was a Canadian politician.

He was elected to the Legislative Council of the Province of Canada for the division of de La Vallière in 1860 and served until Confederation. He was appointed to the Legislative Council of Quebec for de La Vallière in 1867 and served until his death in 1884.

References

1809 births
1884 deaths
Quebec Liberal Party MLCs
Members of the Legislative Council of the Province of Canada